Ramesh Bhat is a multiple-award–winning Indian actor. He has worked predominantly in Kannada films and television serials.

Early life
Ramesh Bhat was born in Kundapur. He completed his primary education at Manki and portrayed national leaders like Jawaharlal Nehru in school day functions. He moved to Bangalore when his father, Rathnakar Rao, migrated there. He later studied at Model High School in Chamarajapet, Bangalore and went on to complete his diploma in mechanical engineering from SJ Polytechnic in Bangalore. He briefly worked at Kirloskar as a fitter before joining his father's business. He also ran his own business in Basavanagudi.

Career 
In the 1960s and 1970s, young Ramesh worked with theatre groups like Spandana, Nataranga, and Benaka. Working in theatre brought him closer to Shankar Nag, resulting in several plays, films and TV series. He was the assistant director for the television series Malgudi Days. He has also directed a movie named Parameshi Prema Prasanga, which was nominated for the National Awards in 1983.

Awards 
 2010: Karnataka Rajyotsava award
 2010–11: Karnataka State Film Award for Best Supporting Actor – Uyyale
 2015: Karnataka State Film Award for Best Supporting Actor – Mana Manthana

Notable filmography
All films are in Kannada, unless otherwise noted.

Short Movies

References

External links
 
 Ramesh Bhat Filmography

Male actors in Kannada cinema
Indian male film actors
People from Udupi district
Living people
Place of birth missing (living people)
20th-century Indian male actors
21st-century Indian male actors
Male actors from Karnataka
Recipients of the Rajyotsava Award 2010
1947 births